Brucella gallinifaecis is a gram-negative, non-spore-forming, rod-shaped bacteria from the genus of Brucella which was isolated from chicken faeces in Germany.

References

External links
Type strain of Ochrobactrum gallinifaecis at BacDive -  the Bacterial Diversity Metadatabase

Hyphomicrobiales
Bacteria described in 2003